The 1986–87 Bradford City A.F.C. season was the 74th in the club's history.

The club finished 10th in Division Two, reached the 4th round of the FA Cup, and the 4th round of the Milk Cup.

Following damage to home stadium Valley Parade at the end of the 1984–85 season, Bradford City continued to play 'home' games on 'neutral' ground, Odsal in the city, until Valley Parade reopened on 26 December 1986.

Sources

References

Bradford City A.F.C. seasons
Bradford City